Walter Edwin McCornack (January 22, 1875 – June 30, 1939) was an American football player, coach, and lawyer.  He served as the head football coach at Dartmouth College from 1901 to 1902 and at Northwestern University from 1903 to 1905, compiling a career college football record of 41–8–5.  McCornack's record at Northwestern was 26–5–4.  His winning percentage of .800 is the highest in Northwestern Wildcats football program history.

Early life and career 
McCornack was born in Chicago, Illinois on January 22, 1875.  He attended Chicago's Englewood High School before entering Dartmouth with the class of 1897.  

At Dartmouth, McCornack played football and baseball and was the captain of the football team in 1895 and 1896. McCornack graduated from Dartmouth in 1897 an earned an LLB from Northwestern in 1899. 

He worked as a lawyer for the Interstate Commerce Commission.  McCornack died at his home in Chicago on June 30, 1939.

Head coaching record

College

References

External links
 

1875 births
1939 deaths
19th-century players of American football
American football quarterbacks
Dartmouth Big Green football coaches
Dartmouth Big Green football players
Northwestern Wildcats football coaches
Phillips Exeter Academy people
High school football coaches in New Hampshire
Illinois lawyers
Northwestern University Pritzker School of Law alumni
Sportspeople from Chicago
Players of American football from Chicago
Englewood Technical Prep Academy alumni